J. James (full name and dates of birth and death unknown) was an English cricketer.  James' batting and bowling styles are also not known.

What is known about James is that he played two first-class matches for Northamptonshire in the 1906 County Championship, playing against Nottinghamshire and Warwickshire.  In these two matches, he scored just two runs, while with the ball he took two wickets at an average of 62.50, with best figures of 1/14.

References

External links
J. James at ESPNcricinfo
J. James at CricketArchive

English cricketers
Northamptonshire cricketers